The Parechinidae are a family of sea urchins in the class Echinoidea.

Characteristics
All camarodonts have imperforate tubercles and compound ambulacral plates. In addition, the characteristics of the parechinids include the interambulacral plates being densely covered with tubercles with many subequal tubercles, and the buccal notches being insignificant in size. The globiferous pedicellariae between the spines have widely open blades each with many lateral teeth.

Genera

Fossils
Isechinus Lambert, 1903

References